Wavertree Technology Park railway station is in the suburbs of Liverpool, at the western end of Olive Mount cutting, on the original Liverpool-Manchester line. The station opened on 13 August 2000, at a cost of £2 million. Train services are operated by Northern Trains.

Since 5 March 2015, trains through the station have used overhead wire electric traction, as part of the electrification of George Stephenson's original Liverpool and Manchester Railway and the branch line to Wigan.

Facilities
The station has a ticket office (located on the bridge above the platforms) that is staffed throughout the hours of service, seven days per week (05:15 - midnight Monday to Saturday, 08:00 - 23:45 Sunday).  Waiting shelters are provided at platform level on each side, with digital display screens, customer help points and an automated public address system to provide train running information.  Both platforms have lifts from the footbridge (which has ramped access from the main entrance and car park), so are fully accessible for mobility-impaired users.

Services

There are three trains per hour in each direction Monday to Saturday, with two on Sunday. All services are operated by Northern Trains:

Eastbound

Fast services to the Airport and regular locals to Victoria both ended at the May 2018 timetable change. This timetable change was also when TransPennine Express introduced Liverpool-North East services, which run via Manchester Victoria. These pass through the station without stopping.

Westbound

Gallery

References

External links

Railway stations in Liverpool
DfT Category F1 stations
Railway stations opened by Railtrack
Railway stations in Great Britain opened in 2000
Northern franchise railway stations